Barnegat Lighthouse State Park is located on the northern tip of Long Beach Island in Ocean County, New Jersey, United States. The area where the lighthouse stands was regarded as one of the most important navigational points for ships bound to and from New York Harbor. The ships were dependent upon the Barnegat Lighthouse to avoid the shoals extending from the shoreline. The fast currents, shifting sandbars, and offshore shoals challenged sailors. The park is included as a maritime site on the New Jersey Coastal Heritage Trail. The park is operated and maintained by the New Jersey Division of Parks and Forestry.

Barnegat Lighthouse
The lighthouse is a popular tourist site due to its view of the surrounding areas. The lighthouse is open from Memorial Day to Labor Day (weather permitting).

Trails
The Maritime Forest Trail is a 1/5-mile long, self-guided loop trail through maritime forest on Long Beach Island. The trail is classified as easy to moderate.

Historical sites
The Barnegat Lighthouse Interpretive Center is open to those wishing to learn the history and environment surrounding the Barnegat Lighthouse.

References

Website for the Barnegat Lighthouse State Park from the New Jersey Department of Environmental Protection (NJDEP)
National Park Service's website for The New Jersey Coastal Heritage Trail Route

Barnegat Light, New Jersey
Parks in Ocean County, New Jersey
State parks of New Jersey
IUCN Category III